Cartrema is a genus of a few species of flowering plants in the family Oleaceae, native to southeastern Asia, southern China, and North America (Mexico, Central America, southeastern United States), formerly treated as section Leiolea of Osmanthus. Species of Cartrema may be distinguished from those of Osmanthus by the paniculate inflorescences of the former.

Species
Species accepted:
 Cartrema americana (L.) G.L.Nesom – Devilwood – southeastern US from Texas to Virginia; eastern and southern Mexico
 Cartrema floridana (Chapm.) G.L.Nesom - Florida
 Cartrema marginata (Champ. ex Benth.) de Juana – Nansei-shoto, Taiwan, Vietnam, Anhui, Fujian, Guangdong, Guangxi, Guizhou, Hainan, Hunan, Jiangxi, Sichuan, Yunnan, Zhejiang
 Cartrema matsumurana (Hayata) de Juana – Assam, Thailand, Laos, Cambodia, Vietnam, Anhui, Guangdong, Guangxi, Guizhou, Jiangxi, Taiwan, Yunnan, Zhejiang 
 Cartrema minor (P.S.Green) de Juana – Fujian, Guangdong, Guangxi, Jiangxi, Zhejiang
 Cartrema scortechinii (King & Gamble) de Juana – Thailand, Sumatra, Pen Malaysia
 Cartrema sumatrana (P.S.Green) de Juana – Sumatra

References

External links 
 

Oleeae
Oleaceae genera
Taxa named by Constantine Samuel Rafinesque